The Kala Oya is the third longest river in Sri Lanka.

Its catchment area receives approximately 3,169 million cubic metres of rain per year, and approximately 5 percent of the water reaches the sea. It has a catchment area of 1,792 square kilometers.

Tributaries 

 Dambulu Oya
 Mirisgoni Oya
 Hawanella oya
 Moragolla Oya
 Maninda Oya

See also 
 List of dams and reservoirs in Sri Lanka
 List of rivers of Sri Lanka

References 

Rivers of Sri Lanka